Tuxanci is a freeware Czech video game inspired by Bulánci. It was written in the C language, while sound, text and graphics were been worked using SDL.

The game is distributed under the GNU GPL license.

References 

Open-source video games
Video games developed in the Czech Republic
Action video games
2007 video games